Frédéric Talgorn (born 2 July 1961 in Toulouse, France) is a French composer for film and television.

He studied music at the Conservatoire de Paris where his teachers included Sabine Lacoraet and Yvonne Loriod, but he completed his studies on his own. In 1987 he moved to the United States where he began to compose film music. He also wrote the official music to accompany the Olympic flame for the 1992 Winter Olympic Games. Notable film scores include Edge of Sanity (1989), Delta Force 2: The Colombian Connection (1990), Robot Jox (1990), Fortress (1992) and The Temp (1993). He also has an extensive catalogue of concert music, and has often conducted his own works in concert and recording sessions. He has also conducted and recorded film scores of others with the Royal Scottish National Orchestra.

Selected works

Concert Scores
Petite suite dans les idées for orchestra (Radio France commission)
Mandala for solio violin and orchestra
Concerto for Trumpet (1990, published Editions Leduc)
Olympus, for brass and percussion ensemble
Elegy for solo double bass and strings
Vinum et Sanguinem (1993, cantata for choir, soloists, and small orchestra)
 Concerto for Percussion (1997)
 Wind Octet (1983)

Television Scores
 Young Indiana Jones (1992-93)
 Heavy Metal 2000 (2000)
 The Little Prince (2010)

Film Scores
 Tellement proches (2009)
 Trouble at Timpetill (2008)
 Asterix at the Olympic Games (2008)
 Molière (2007)
 Président (2007)
 Les Aiguilles Rouges (2007)
 Those Happy Days (2006)
 Anthony Zimmer (2005)
 RRRrrr!!! (2004)
 Laisse tes mains sur mes hanches (2003)
 The Devil's Arithmetic (1999)
 Angels in the Endzone (1997)
 A Rat's Tale (1997)
 Le Brasier (1993)
 The Temp (1993)
 Fortress (1992)
 Delta Force 2: The Colombian Connection (1990)
 Robot Jox (1990)
 Edge of Sanity (1989)

References

External links

Official Frédéric Talgorn website
Works published by the Dewolfe Music library

1961 births
Conservatoire de Paris alumni
French film score composers
French television composers
Living people
French male film score composers
Male television composers
Musicians from Toulouse